Augustus Page (1855 – 31 August 1898) was a New Zealand cricketer. He played in one first-class match for Canterbury in 1884/85.

See also
 List of Canterbury representative cricketers

References

External links
 

1855 births
1898 deaths
Canterbury cricketers
Cricketers from Stroud
New Zealand cricketers